Niese is a surname, and may refer to:

Benedikt Niese (1849–1910), German classical scholar
Charlotte Niese (1854–1935), German writer, poet and teacher
Danielle de Niese (born 1979), Australian-born soprano
Hansi Niese (Johanna Niese, 1875–1934), Austrian actress
Jon Niese (born 1986), American baseball player

See also
Niese (Emmer), river in Germany